The name Juan was used to name two tropical cyclones in the Atlantic Ocean and three tropical cyclones in the Western Pacific Ocean by the Philippine Atmospheric, Geophysical and Astronomical Services Administration (PAGASA). The name was retired from future use in the Atlantic Ocean after 2003, and was replaced with Joaquin. Further, the name was retired from future use by the PAGASA after 2010, and was replaced with Jose.

In the Atlantic:
Hurricane Juan (1985) – a Category 1 hurricane that struck the Gulf Coast of the United States, causing 12 deaths and $3.2 billion (US$2005) in damage.
Hurricane Juan (2003) – a Category 2 hurricane that affected the Canadian provinces of Nova Scotia and Prince Edward Island, causing 8 deaths and $200 million in damage.

In the West Pacific:
Tropical Depression Juan (2002) (13W) – Moved over the central Philippines, killing 14 people.
Typhoon Saomai (2006) (T0608, 08W, Juan) – A strong Category 5-equivalent typhoon that made landfall in Taiwan and the People's Republic of China, killing 441 and causing $1.5 billion (2006 USD) in damage.
Typhoon Megi (2010) (T1013, 15W, Juan) – struck Luzon, causing damages amounting to ₱15 billion

Atlantic hurricane set index articles
Pacific typhoon set index articles